Moridan may refer to:
 Moridan, Langarud, Gilan Province
 Moridan, Rasht, Gilan Province
 Moridan Rural District, in Gilan Province